Ronald Peter Perranoski (April 1, 1936 – October 2, 2020) was an American professional baseball player and coach. He also played for the Detroit Tigers and the California Angels. After his playing career, Perranoski worked as a Major League pitching coach, winning two more World Series with the Dodgers in the 1980s.

Baseball career
Perranoski was born in Paterson, New Jersey and grew up in Fair Lawn, New Jersey, where he attended Fair Lawn High School.

Perranoski attended Michigan State University, where he was a teammate and friend of Dick Radatz, who also would become a standout reliever in the 1960s. In 1963, Perranoski won 16 of 19 relief decisions for the Los Angeles Dodgers, who went on to win that year's World Series in four consecutive games over the New York Yankees. He appeared in Game Two of that Series and earned a save in relief of Johnny Podres.

After his playing career ended, Perranoski was the Dodgers' minor league pitching coordinator (1973–80), then the MLB pitching coach for Los Angeles for 14 seasons (1981–94). He joined the San Francisco Giants as minor league pitching coordinator in 1995, was promoted to bench coach in 1997 and then to pitching coach in 1998-99. He had been a special assistant to general manager Brian Sabean since 2000.

In 1983, Perranoski was inducted into the National Polish-American Sports Hall of Fame.

In 1965, Perranoski appeared in an episode of the television series Branded ("Coward Step Aside", S1, Ep 7) with former baseball player and series star Chuck Connors.

Perranoski died in his home in Vero Beach, Florida, on October 2, 2020, following complications from a long illness.

Transactions
June 9, 1958: Signed by the Chicago Cubs as an amateur free agent.
April 8, 1960: Traded by the Chicago Cubs with Lee Handley (minors), Johnny Goryl, and $25,000 to the Los Angeles Dodgers for Don Zimmer.
November 28, 1967: Traded by the Los Angeles Dodgers with John Roseboro and Bob Miller to the Minnesota Twins for Mudcat Grant and Zoilo Versalles.
July 30, 1971: Selected off waivers by the Detroit Tigers from the Minnesota Twins.
July 31, 1972: Released by the Detroit Tigers.
August 7, 1972: Signed as a Free Agent with the Los Angeles Dodgers.
October 19, 1972: Released by the Los Angeles Dodgers.
April 6, 1973: Signed as a Free Agent with the California Angels.
October 4, 1973: Released by the California Angels.

See also
 List of Major League Baseball annual saves leaders

References

External links

First Game boxscore
Venezuelan Professional Baseball League

1936 births
2020 deaths
American League saves champions
American people of Polish descent
Baseball coaches from New Jersey
Baseball players from Paterson, New Jersey
Burlington Bees players
California Angels players
Detroit Tigers players
Fair Lawn High School alumni
Fort Worth Cats players
Leones del Caracas players
American expatriate baseball players in Venezuela
Los Angeles Dodgers coaches
Los Angeles Dodgers players
Major League Baseball pitchers
Major League Baseball bench coaches
Major League Baseball bullpen coaches
Major League Baseball pitching coaches
Michigan State Spartans baseball players
Michigan State University alumni
Minnesota Twins players
Montreal Royals players
People from Fair Lawn, New Jersey
St. Paul Saints (AA) players
San Antonio Missions players
San Francisco Giants coaches
Sportspeople from Bergen County, New Jersey